Margaret Petherbridge Farrar (March 23, 1897 – June 11, 1984) was an American journalist and the first crossword puzzle editor for The New York Times (1942–1968). Creator of many of the rules of modern crossword design, she compiled and edited a long-running series of crossword puzzle books including the first-ever book of any kind published by Simon & Schuster.

Biography
Margaret Petherbridge was born March 23, 1897, in Brooklyn, New York, to Margaret (Furey) and Henry Petherbridge, who owned a licorice factory. A lifelong resident of New York City, she attended Berkeley Institute in Brooklyn and graduated from Smith College in 1919.

Her career in crossword puzzles began at the New York World in 1921. She had been hired as the secretary to the editor of the Sunday edition of the New York World; he eventually assigned her to assist crossword inventor Arthur Wynne, who was overloaded with reader submissions of puzzles – and with complaints about flawed puzzles. Petherbridge had never solved a puzzle herself and therefore chose puzzles to be printed without testing them, until fellow World employee Franklin Pierce Adams criticized her for it; in response, she tried the puzzles, and discovered to her dismay that some of them were unsolvable. She subsequently described her reaction as "(taking) an oath to edit the crosswords to the essence of perfection;" her puzzles eventually became more popular than Wynne's.

In January 1924 Petherbridge was given an advance of $25 and asked to compile a book of crossword puzzles by Richard L. Simon and M. Lincoln Schuster, who were launching a book publishing company but did not yet have any manuscripts. The Cross Word Puzzle Book launched Simon & Schuster as a major publisher and was the first of four bestselling compilations published that year. Simon & Schuster's crossword books became the longest continuously published book series.

In 1926 Petherbridge married John C. Farrar, one of the co-founders of Farrar & Rinehart and Farrar, Straus and Giroux. She left the World to raise a family, and returned to journalism in 1942 as founding puzzle editor of The New York Times. She remained with the newspaper until 1969. She also edited novels for Farrar, Straus and Giroux (1950–1960), and upon her husband's death in 1974 she succeeded him as a member of the company's board of directors.

In 1959, a New Yorker article described Farrar as "[p]robably the most important person in the world of the crossword puzzle."  The article quoted Farrar's preferences for clues: "We don’t allow two-letter words and we avoid as much as possible obsolete words, variants, obscure words, and clichés—words like 'gnu' and 'emu' and 'proa' ... I favor using lots of book titles, play titles, names in the news, and so on. I also favor puzzles with a unifying theme—what I call the inner-clue puzzle, which was invented by one of our best constructors, Harold T. Bers. For example, an inner-clue puzzle he did for us recently was called 'Catalogue' and had answers that were words or phrases like 'catbird seat,' 'catacombs,' 'Kitty Hawk,' and 'pussyfoot.'"

Farrar died June 11, 1984, at her home in Manhattan. Up to her death, she compiled two crossword puzzle books a year for Simon & Schuster (she was working on the 134th volume), and was editing puzzles for the Los Angeles Times syndicate.

Legacy
Puzzle creator, editor and publisher Stanley Newman has referred to Farrar as a "crossword genius", and credits her with the creation of "many, if not most" of the rules that guide modern crossword design.

"Perhaps Margaret Farrar's greatest legacy is the large number of expert puzzlemakers she discovered and/or nurtured over the years – Will Weng, Eugene T. Maleska, Frances Hansen, Anne Fox, A.J. Santora, Diana R. Sessions, Jules Arensberg, Herbert Ettenson, Harold T. Bers, Mel Taub … the list goes on," wrote Will Shortz. "Other editors have left their mark on the world of crosswords … but it was Margaret Farrar, more than anyone else, who established the American crossword rules and format, and whose smooth, sensible, timeless style of editing I still try to emulate today."

References

 Bennett, Mark. "SOLVING THE PUZZLE: Finding answers to the Sunday New York Times crossword puzzle a daunting task". Terre Haute Tribune-Star.

1897 births
1984 deaths
American women journalists
Smith College alumni
Crossword compilers
20th-century American Episcopalians
20th-century American women